Enrique Mederos Flores (Ciudad de México, July 15, 1967 – Ciudad de México, April 23, 2004), better known as Enrique Mederos, was a Mexican voice actor and dubbing director best known for his roles as Mewtwo in Pokémon: The First Movie, Old Kai in Dragon Ball Z and Ryota Miyagi in Slam Dunk.

Mederos died on April 23, 2004 as a result of a hepatitis infection.

Filmography
 True Grit - La Bouef (his debut role) (voiceover for Glen Campbell)
 THX 1138 - THX 1138 (voiceover for Robert Duvall)
 Harry el Sucio - Inspector Harry Callahan (voiceover for Clint Eastwood)
 Vivir y Dejar Morir - James Bond (voiceover for Roger Moore)
 High Plains Drifter - Stranger (voiceover for Clint Eastwood)
 El Hombre del Revólver de Oro - James Bond (voiceover for Roger Moore)
 .44 Magnum - Inspector Harry Callahan (voiceover for Clint Eastwood)
 The Outlaw Josey Wales - José Wales (voiceover for Clint Eastwood)
 La Espía que me Amó - James Bond (voiceover for Roger Moore)
 La Guerra de las Galaxias - Capitan Han Solo (original) (voiceover for Harrison Ford)
 The Enforcer - Inspector Harry Callahan (voiceover for Clint Eastwood)
 Escape de Alcatraz - Frank Morgan (voiceover for Clint Eastwood)
 MASH - Trapper John McIntyre (voiceover for Elliott Gould)
 La Letra Escarlata - Reverend Arthur Dimmesdale (voiceover for John Heard)
 Dama Oscar - Axel Von Fersen
 El Agujero Negro - V.I.N.C.E.N.T.
 Alien - Capitan Dallas (voiceover for Tom Skerritt)
 Moonraker - James Bond (voiceover for Roger Moore)
 El Imperio Contraataca - Capitan Han Solo (original) (voiceover for Harrison Ford)
 Impacto Fulminante - Inspector Harry Callahan (voiceover for Clint Eastwood)
 Solo Para Sus Ojos - James Bond (voiceover for Roger Moore)
 El Diablo y Max Devlin - Max Devlin (voiceover for Elliott Gould)
 Dias de Nuestras Vidas - Roman Brady (1st voice)
 Dias de Nuestras Vidas - John Black (1st voice)
 Fuga de Nueva York - Snake Plissken (voiceover for Kurt Russell)
 Coogan's Bluff - Walt Coogan (voiceover for Clint Eastwood)
 Por un Puñado de Dólares - El Hombre Sin Nombre (voiceover for Clint Eastwood)
 Honkytonk Man - Red Stovall (voiceover for Clint Eastwood)
 Octopussy - James Bond (voiceover for Roger Moore)
 El Regreso del Jedi - Capitan Han Solo (original) (voiceover for Harrison Ford)
 Por Algunos Dolares Más - El Hombre Sin Nombre (voiceover for Clint Eastwood)
 El Bueno, el Malo, y el Feo - El Hombre Sin Nombre (voiceover for Clint Eastwood)
 Hang 'Em High - Deputy Marshall Jed Cooper (voiceover for Clint Eastwood)
 Terminator - Kyle Reese (voiceover for Michael Biehn)
 M*A*S*H* - Trapper John McIntyre (voiceover for Wayne Rogers)
 M*A*S*H* - B.J. Hunnicutt (voiceover for Mike Farrell)
 Pale Rider - Preacher (voiceover for Clint Eastwood)
 En la Mira de los Asesinos - James Bond (voiceover for Roger Moore)
 El Club de los Cinco - Brian Johnson (voiceover for Anthony Michael Hall)
 Maid to Order - Carlos Montgomery (voiceover for Tom Skerritt)
 Sala de Espera del Infierno - Inspector Harry Callahan (voiceover for Clint Eastwood)
 Duro de Matar - John McClane (voiceover for Bruce Willis)
 Mi Pobre Angelito - Peter McCallister (voiceover for John Heard)
 Duro de Matar 2 - John McClane (voiceover for Bruce Willis)
 Mi Pobre Angelito 2: Perdido en Nueva York - Peter McCallister (voiceover for John Heard)
 Los Imperdonables - William Munny (voiceover for Clint Eastwood)
 En la Línea de Fuego - Frank Horrigan (voiceover for Clint Eastwood)
 Tombstone - Doc Holliday (voiceover for Val Kilmer)
 Ranma ½ (1st movie) - Soun Tendo
 Key the Metal Idol - Shuichi Tataki
 Street Fighter: La Última Batalla - Sagat (voiceover for Wes Studi)
 Street Fighter II: La Película - Sagat
 The Plot of the Fuma Clan - Old Man Suminawa
The Crow - Eric Draven (voiceover Brandon Lee)
 Trapper John M.D. - Trapper John McIntyre (voiceover for Pernell Roberts)
 Duro de Matar: La Venganza - John McClane (voiceover for Bruce Willis)
 Patlabor - Shunsuke
 Fuga de Los Ángeles - Snake Plissken (voiceover for Kurt Russell)
 Neon Genesis Evangelion - Toji Suzuhara
 Cardcaptor Sakura - Fujitaka Kinomoto
 Animal Farm - Boxer
 Pókemon: La Película - Mewtwo
 Pokémon 2000: La Película - Lawrence III
 El Castillo de Cagliostro - Groundskeeper
 Pulgarcita - Beetle

Mexican male voice actors
1960 births
2004 deaths